9991 Anežka, provisional designation , is a carbonaceous Themistian asteroid from the outer region of the asteroid belt, approximately 10 kilometers in diameter.

The asteroid was discovered on 5 October 1997, by Czech astronomer Zdeněk Moravec at the South Bohemian Kleť Observatory in the Czech Republic. It was named after the discoverer's grandmother, Anežka Moravcová.

Orbit and classification 

Anežka is a carbonaceous asteroid and member of the Themis family, a dynamical family of outer main-belt asteroids with nearly coplanar ecliptical orbits. It orbits the Sun at a distance of 2.7–3.7 AU once every 5 years and 9 months (2,094 days). Its orbit has an eccentricity of 0.16 and an inclination of 2° with respect to the ecliptic.

Physical characteristics

Rotation period 

A rotational lightcurve for this asteroid was obtained from photometric observations at the Palomar Transient Factory in December 2012. It gave it a rotation period of  hours with a brightness variation of 0.24 in magnitude.

Diameter and albedo 

According to the survey carried out by the NEOWISE mission of NASA's Wide-field Infrared Survey Explorer, the asteroid measures 12.3 kilometers in diameter and its surface has an albedo of 0.097, while the Collaborative Asteroid Lightcurve Link assumes an albedo of 0.08 and calculates a diameter of 7.9 kilometers.

Naming 

This minor planet was named after the discoverer's grandmother, Anežka Moravcová (b 1924), on her 75th birthday. The official naming citation was published by the Minor Planet Center on 4 May 1999.

References

External links 
 Asteroid Lightcurve Database (LCDB), query form (info)
 Dictionary of Minor Planet Names, Google books
 Asteroids and comets rotation curves, CdR – Observatoire de Genève, Raoul Behrend
 Discovery Circumstances: Numbered Minor Planets (5001)-(10000) – Minor Planet Center
 
 

009991
Discoveries by Zdeněk Moravec
Named minor planets
19971005